Charles Weber may refer to:

 Charles Maria Weber, founder of Stockton, California
 Charles Weber (baseball), general manager of the Chicago Cubs
 Chuck Weber (American football) (1930–2017), former American football linebacker
 Chuck Weber (ice hockey) (born 1973), American ice hockey coach
 Chuck Weber (racing driver) (born 1958), American stock car driver
 Chuck Weber (politician), American politician and member of the Kansas House of Representatives

See also
 Charlie Weber (disambiguation)
 Charles Webber (disambiguation)